Parker Nicholas McLachlin (born May 10, 1979) is an American professional golfer and golf instructor who plays on the PGA Tour.

McLachlin was born in Honolulu, Hawaii. He graduated from Punahou School in 1997 and UCLA in 2002 with a degree in sociology.

McLachlin turned professional in 2003 and played on mini-tours until 2006 when he played the Nationwide Tour. He played on the PGA Tour in both 2007 and 2008 after successfully completing qualifying school each year. In 2008, he won his first PGA Tour event, the Legends Reno-Tahoe Open, and secured his tour card through 2010. McLachlin has not played full-time since 2010.

Personal life
McLachlin's mother Beth competed on Team USA's National Women's Volleyball Team.

Professional wins (1)

PGA Tour wins (1)

Results in major championships

CUT = missed the halfway cut
Note: McLachlin never played in the Masters Tournament or The Open Championship.

See also
 2006 PGA Tour Qualifying School graduates
 2007 PGA Tour Qualifying School graduates

References

External links
 
 
 

American male golfers
UCLA Bruins men's golfers
PGA Tour golfers
Golfers from Honolulu
Golfers from Scottsdale, Arizona
Punahou School alumni
1979 births
Living people